Andrzej Marecki (2 September 1898 – 4 July 1943) was a Polish military officer. He was a colonel in the Polish Army, lecturer in tactics and member of the Polish General Staff during World War II. He died in the controversial 1943 Gibraltar B-24 crash.

Biography
Andrzej Marecki was born on 2 September 1898. He participated in the Polish–Soviet War of 1918–1921. In the years 1924–1926 he studied in the Wyższa Szkoła Wojenna (Polish Military Academy). After graduating, from 1928 he was a lecturer in tactics at his alma mater. From February 1936 he was a military attaché at the Polish diplomatic mission in Stockholm. In February 1939 he was attached to the Polish General Staff. Following Polish defeat after the German and Soviet invasion of Poland, he made his way through Romania to France, where he joined the recreated Polish Army in France. He taught a Polish course at the École Supérieure de Guerre, and later became a Polish liaison officer at the French General Staff. In May 1940 he was attached once again to the Polish General Staff.

He died in the controversial 1943 Gibraltar B-24 crash on 4 July 1943. Sikorski was the Polish Army and Prime Minister of the Polish government in exile. The catastrophe, while officially classified as an accident, has led to several conspiracy theories that persist to this day, and often propose that the crash was an assassination, which has variously been blamed on the Soviets, British, Nazis or even a dissenting Polish faction.

Remembrance
The remains were flown to Warsaw, and then taken to the Department of Forensic Medicine in Kraków for examination. On 9 December 2010, Tadeusz Klimecki and Andrzej Marecki were re-buried in the Powązki Military Cemetery in Warsaw.

Awards 
Marecki was a recipient of:

 Virtuti Militari, 5th class
 Gold Cross of Merit

References

Further reading
 Marecki Andrzej (1898–1943). Polski słownik biograficzny. T. 19.

External links 
 

1898 births
1943 deaths
Burials at Powązki Military Cemetery
Polish people of the Polish–Soviet War
Polish military officers
Recipients of the Gold Cross of Merit (Poland)
Recipients of the Silver Cross of the Virtuti Militari
Polish military attachés
Victims of aviation accidents or incidents in Gibraltar
Victims of aviation accidents or incidents in 1943